Little Beach is a barrier island along the coast of New Jersey. It is believed to be the last uninhabited barrier island left on the U.S. Atlantic coast. It is part of Galloway Township, in Atlantic County, New Jersey.

The island is now part of the Edwin B. Forsythe National Wildlife Refuge. Access is permitted only to researchers, who must apply for a federal permit.

"Little Beach" was not always uninhabited and contained a small collection of fishing cabins that were used for decades before being burned down to make the island a refuge. In addition, Little Beach, like Brigantine, was a popular summer fishing spot for the Lenape Natives for generations.

Geography
Little Beach is a barrier island along the Atlantic Ocean between Little Egg Inlet on the northeast, and Brigantine Inlet on the southwest. An expanse of salt marsh and tidal channels separates Little Beach from Great Bay and Little Bay.

Little Beach was described in 1834 as,

An 1878 description of Little Beach is as follows, viz,

History
In the early 20th century, Little Beach was a community on the verge of becoming a major beach resort. Plans to build a bridge from the mainland were abandoned in 1929, forever isolating Little Beach. For that reason, some call it the "Lost Island of New Jersey."

A few signs of a once-active community remain: ruins of a lifesaving station, poles for power lines, an outhouse, and a deteriorating dock stretching the width of the island.

References

External links
Channel 6 Action News (Philadelphia) coverage of Little Beach, New Jersey

Galloway Township, New Jersey
Barrier islands of New Jersey
Landforms of Atlantic County, New Jersey
Uninhabited islands of New Jersey